The men's lightweight double sculls event at the 2020 Summer Olympics took place from 24 to 29 July 2021 at the Sea Forest Waterway. 36 rowers from 18 nations competed.

Schedule

The competition was held over six days.

All times are Japan Standard Time (UTC+9)

* Event has been rescheduled.

Results

Heats
The first two of each heat qualified for the semifinals, while the remainder went to the repechage.

Heat 1

Heat 2

Heat 3

Repechage
The first three crews in the repechage qualified for the semifinals, while remaining crew to Final C.

Repechage heat 1

Repechage heat 2

Semifinals

Semifinal A/B 1

Semifinal A/B 2

Finals

Final C

Final B

Final A

References

Men's lightweight double sculls
Men's events at the 2020 Summer Olympics